Marlon Barrios (born 12 December 1986) is a Colombian footballer who currently plays in Nicaraguan club Walter Ferreri.

Honours

Individual
 Primera División top goalscorer: 2014 Apertura

References

1986 births
Living people
Colombian footballers
Real Cartagena footballers
Real Madriz FC players
C.D. Walter Ferretti players
Colombian expatriate footballers
Expatriate footballers in Nicaragua
Colombian expatriate sportspeople in Nicaragua
Association football midfielders
Sportspeople from Cartagena, Colombia